Group 4 was one of six groups of national teams competing in the group stage of the 1982 FIFA World Cup. Play began on 16 June and ended on 25 June 1982. The group consisted of four teams: Seeded team England, France, Czechoslovakia and World Cup debutants Kuwait.

England won the group after three successive victories and advanced to the second round, along with France.

Standings

Matches

England vs France

Czechoslovakia vs Kuwait

England vs Czechoslovakia

France vs Kuwait

France vs Czechoslovakia

England vs Kuwait

References

External links
 1982 FIFA World Cup archive
 Spain 1982 FIFA Technical Report: Statistical Details of the Matches pp. 116-123

1982 FIFA World Cup
England at the 1982 FIFA World Cup
France at the 1982 FIFA World Cup
Czechoslovakia at the 1982 FIFA World Cup
Kuwait at the 1982 FIFA World Cup